Ohio's 58th House of Representatives district encompasses all of Huron County, western and southern Lorain County, and eastern Seneca County.  Notable cities and villages within the district include Amherst, Attica, Bellevue, Grafton, Greenwich, New London, Norwalk, Vermilion, Wellington, and Willard, among other locations.  The 58th District is mainly a rural, agricultural district with the exceptions of Amherst, Norwalk, and Vermilion.

Representatives

Elections

2020

2018

2016

2014

2012

2010

References

Ohio House of Representatives districts
Huron County, Ohio
Lorain County, Ohio
Seneca County, Ohio